Luis Henrique da Silva (born September 1, 1989) is a Brazilian mixed martial artist currently competing in the Light Heavyweight division. A professional since 2013, he has fought in the Ultimate Fighting Championship. He is currently ranked #2 in the KSW Light Heavyweight rankings.

Background
Da Silva began training in various forms of martial arts as a youngster. He then starting training in Muay Thai, and jiu-jitsu as a teenager before transitioning to mixed martial arts in 2011.

Mixed martial arts career
Da Silva made his professional mixed martial arts debut in December 2013. He compiled an undefeated record of 10–0, competing primarily for various regional promotions in North Brazil before signing with the UFC in 2016.

Ultimate Fighting Championship
Da Silva made his promotional debut against Jonathan Wilson on June 4, 2016 at UFC 199. He won the fight TKO in the second round.

Da Silva next faced Joachim Christensen on October 1, 2016 at UFC Fight Night 96.  He won the fight by submission in the second round.

Da Silva faced Paul Craig on December 17, 2016 at UFC on Fox 22. He lost the fight via submission in the second round.

Da Silva faced promotional newcomer Jordan Johnson on January 28, 2017 at UFC on Fox 23. He lost the fight via unanimous decision.

Da Silva faced Ion Cuțelaba on June 11, 2017 at UFC Fight Night 110.  He lost the fight via knockout in the first round.

Da Silva faced promotional newcomer Gökhan Saki on September 23, 2017 at UFC Fight Night 117. He lost the fight via knockout in the first round.

Da Silva was released from the UFC on Nov. 15, 2017.

Post UFC 
After going 6-4 outside of major promotions, including an appearance on Dana White's Contender Series Brazil 2, where he lost to Johnny Walker via unanimous decision, Da Silva signed with Konfrontacja Sztuk Walki (KSW) coming off two stoppages on the Brazilian scene In his first appearance, he faced former champion Tomasz Narkun on October 14, 2022 at KSW 75: Ruchała vs. Stasiak. After getting dominated on the ground in the first round, Da Silva knocked out Narkun with a front kick 28 seconds into the second round.

In his sophomore performance with the promotion, da Silva faced Oumar Sy on March 17, 2023 at KSW 80: Ruchała vs. Eskiev, getting submitted via rear-naked choke in the first round.

Championships and accomplishments
Pitbull Fight Championship 
PFC Light Heavyweight Championship (one time) 

Ultimate Fighting Championship 
Performance of the Night (one time)

Mixed martial arts record

|-
|Loss
|align=center|19–9
|Oumar Sy
|Submission (rear-naked choke)
|KSW 80: Ruchała vs. Eskiev
|
|align=center|1
|align=center|1:40
|Lubin, Poland
| 
|-
|Win
|align=center|19–8
|Tomasz Narkun
|KO (front kick)
|KSW 75: Ruchała vs. Stasiak
|
|align=center|2
|align=center|0:28
|Nowy Sącz, Poland
|
|-
|Win
|align=center|18–8
|Natalicio Filho
|KO (punches)
|Pitbull Fight 59
|
|align=center|2
|align=center|4:07
|Castanhal, Brazil
|
|-
|Win
|align=center|17–8
|Leonardo Vasconcelos
|TKO (punches)
|EF Fight Champions
|
|align=center|1
|align=center|4:17
|Benevides, Brazil
| 
|-
|Loss
|align=center|16–8
|Ivan Erslan
|TKO (punches)
|FNC 4
|
|align=center|1
|align=center|3:20
|Osijek, Croatia
| 
|-
|Win
|align=center|16–7
|Maico Machado
|TKO (punches)
|Redenção Fight MMA
|
|align=center|2
|align=center|4:20
|Redenção, Brazil
|
|-
|Loss
|align=center|15–7
|Karlos Vemola
|Decision (unanimous)
|Oktagon 13
|
|align=center|3
|align=center|5:00
|Prague, Czech Republic
|
|-
|Win
|align=center|15–6
|Jan Gottvald
|KO (punch)
|Oktagon 12
|
|align=center|1
|align=center|4:52
|Bratislava, Slovakia
|
|-
|Loss
|align=center|14–6
|Kleber Silva
|KO (punch)
|Super Fight Brazil 1
|
|align=center|1
|align=center|2:41
|Teresina, Piauí,  Brazil
|
|-
|Loss
|align=center|14–5
|Johnny Walker
|Decision (unanimous)
|Dana White's Contender Series Brazil 2
|
|align=center|3
|align=center|5:00
|Las Vegas, Nevada, United States
|
|-
|Win
|align=center|14–4
|Edvaldo de Oliveira
|Decision (unanimous)
|Arena Fight 8: In Memory of Meire Cabral
|
|align=center|3
|align=center|5:00
|Redenção, Brazil
|
|-
|Win
|align=center|13–4
|José Otávio dos Santos Lacerda
|TKO (retirement)
|Mr. Cage 34 
|
|align=center|2
|align=center|5:00
|Manaus, Brazil
|
|-
|Loss
|align=center|12–4
|Gökhan Saki
|KO (punch)
|UFC Fight Night: Saint Preux vs. Okami 
|
|align=center|1
|align=center|4:45
|Saitama, Japan
|
|-
|Loss
|align=center|12–3
|Ion Cuțelaba
|KO (punches)
|UFC Fight Night: Lewis vs. Hunt
|
|align=center|1
|align=center|0:22
|Auckland, New Zealand
|
|-
|Loss
|align=center|12–2
|Jordan Johnson
|Decision (unanimous)
|UFC on Fox: Shevchenko vs. Peña
|
|align=center|3
|align=center|5:00
|Denver, Colorado, United States
| 
|-
|Loss
|align=center| 12–1
|Paul Craig
|Submission (armbar)
|UFC on Fox: VanZant vs. Waterson
|
|align=center|2
|align=center|1:59
|Sacramento, California, United States
|
|-
|Win
|align=center| 12–0
|Joachim Christensen
|Submission (armbar)
|UFC Fight Night: Lineker vs. Dodson
|
|align=center| 2
|align=center| 4:43
|Portland, Oregon, United States
|
|-
|Win
|align=center| 11–0
|Jonathan Wilson
|TKO (punches)
|UFC 199
|
|align=center| 2
|align=center| 4:11
|Inglewood, California, United States
| 
|-
|Win
|align=center| 10–0
|Ildemar Alcântara
|TKO (punches)
|KJC 2
|
|align=center| 2
|align=center| 4:55
|Belém, Brazil
|
|- 
|Win
|align=center| 9–0
|Mayke Douglas Silva Mosque 
|TKO (punches)
|SPF 40
|
|align=center| 1
|align=center| 0:31
|Castanhal, Brazil
|
|-
|Win
|align=center| 8–0
|Mauricio Santos
|KO (head kick)
|Brutality MMA Fight Championship
|
|align=center| 1
|align=center| 1:29
|Benevides, Brazil
|
|-
|Win
|align=center| 7–0
|Rodrigo Icoaraci
|TKO (doctor stoppage)
|TMMA 
|
|align=center| 2
|align=center| 2:34
|Benevides, Brazil
|
|- 
|Win
|align=center| 6–0
|Messias Pai de Santo
|KO (punches)
|Team Nogueira Ananindeua
|
|align=center| 2
|align=center| 2:15
|Ananindeua, Brazil
|
|- 
|Win
|align=center| 5–0
|Rafael Silva
|TKO (punches)
|Rec Combat 2
|
|align=center| 1
|align=center| 0:32
|Belém, Brazil
|
|- 
|Win
|align=center| 4–0
|Rogério Silva
|TKO (punches)
|Coalizão Fight 4
|
|align=center| 1
|align=center| 1:49
|Benevides, Brazil
|
|- 
|Win
|align=center| 3–0
|Fábio Augusto de Assis Vasconcelos
|TKO (punches)
|Coalizão Fight 3
|
|align=center| 1
|align=center| 3:35
|Belém, Brazil
|
|- 
|Win
|align=center| 2–0
|Alberto Ramos Pinheiro 
|KO (punches)
|BFC
|
|align=center| 1
|align=center| 2:40
|Benevides, Brazil
|
|- 
|Win
|align=center| 1–0
|Jonathan Vale
|TKO (punches)
|Gringo Super Fight 8
|
|align=center| 1
|align=center| 4:28
|Rio de Janeiro, Brazil
|
|-

See also
 List of current UFC fighters
 List of male mixed martial artists

References

External links
 
 

1989 births
Living people
Brazilian male mixed martial artists
Light heavyweight mixed martial artists
Heavyweight mixed martial artists
Mixed martial artists utilizing Muay Thai
Mixed martial artists utilizing Brazilian jiu-jitsu
Sportspeople from Pernambuco
Brazilian Muay Thai practitioners
Brazilian practitioners of Brazilian jiu-jitsu
Ultimate Fighting Championship male fighters